Mudi-āttam is an art form once prevalent, but now disappearing,  in Central Travancore in Kerala. This is performed by the Pulaya and Paraya (Sambava) castes. Originally a fertility-dance, this is now staged as a community entertainment. Young women are the exponents of this. They should have long hair and should number a dozen. Songs are sung to the accompaniment of Karu, Maram (in ancient times), Thudi, Udukku, and Maddalom. In tune with the rhythm and the trend of the song the women sway about, in different patterns, swinging their loosened hair. The founder of this art form is believed to be Pooyinkalamma, the First Mother of the Parayas. 

Karu, Maram, Thudi, Uduku and Maddalam are  percussion instruments.

A prominent exponent of this art form was Mariamma Chedathy.

Dances of Kerala